Dridex also known as Bugat and Cridex is a form of malware that specializes in stealing bank credentials via a system that utilizes macros from Microsoft Word.

The targets of this malware are Windows users who open an email attachment in Word or Excel, causing macros to activate and download Dridex, infecting the computer and opening the victim to banking theft.

The primary objective of this software is to steal banking information from users of infected machines to immediately launch fraudulent transactions. Bank information for the software installs a keyboard listener and performs injection attacks. During 2015, theft caused by this software were estimated at £20 million in the United Kingdom and $10 million in the United States. By 2015, Dridex attacks had been detected in more than 20 countries. In early September 2016, researchers spotted initial support for targeting cryptocurrency wallets.

In December 2019, US authorities filed charges against two suspects believed to have created the Dridex malware, including the group's alleged leader.

Evil Corp
Evil Corp ( Dridex and INDRIK SPIDER) is a Russian hacking group that has been active since 2009. In 2019, the Federal Bureau of Investigation (FBI) named nine alleged members of the group, including them of extorting or stealing over $100,000,000 through hacks that affected 40 countries. The United States Department of the Treasury additionally imposed sanctions against the group. In November 2021, the British Broadcasting Company published an investigation which found that the two alleged leaders of the group were living openly in Russia.

In June of 2022 Mandiant reported that Evil Corp had was using off-the-shelf ransomware, such as Lockbit, to conceal who they are and evade sanctions. The Office of Foreign Assets Control sanctioned Evil Corp in December 2019 over development and use of Dridex malware. People in the United States were banned from "engaging in transactions" with Evil Corp. People outside the US may be subject to secondary sanctions for knowingly facilitating significant transactions with Evil Corp. The US government also charged two members of the gang and offered a reward of $5 million dollars.

Mandiant have also linked the group to threat actor UNC2165.

Emsisoft analysts said in December 2021 that they suspected that a ransomware infection in which REvil was a suspect was in fact the work of Evil Corp.

See also
 Botnet
 Conficker
 Gameover ZeuS
 Operation Tovar
 Timeline of computer viruses and worms
 Tiny Banker Trojan
 Torpig
 Zeus (malware)
 Zombie (computer science)

References

2015 in computing
Windows trojans
Cyberattacks on banking industry
Hacking in the 2020s
2009 establishments in Russia
Russian entities subject to the U.S. Department of the Treasury sanctions
Extortionists
Ransomware